The 1988–89 European Cup was the 29th edition of Europe's premier club handball tournament.

Knockout stage

Round 1

|}

Round 2

|}

Quarterfinals

|}

Semifinals

|}

Finals

|}

External links
 EHF Champions League website
 European Cup 1989 edition

EHF Champions League seasons
Champions League
Champions League